Said Kandi may refer to:
 Said Kandi, Zanjan
 Said Kandi, Mahneshan, Zanjan Province